Auld Lang Syne is a compilation album of phonograph records by Bing Crosby released in 1948 featuring songs that were sung by Crosby and also by Fred Waring and his Glee Club. The songs were later presented in 33 1/3 rpm and 45 rpm sets, respectively. This set featured many of Bing's great hits such as: Silver Threads Among the Gold and Now Is the Hour.

Background
Bing Crosby had enjoyed unprecedented success during the 1940s with his discography showing six No. 1 hits in 1944 alone. His films such as Going My Way and The Bells of St. Mary's were huge successes as were the Road films he made with Bob Hope. On radio, his Kraft Music Hall and Philco Radio Time shows were very popular. Decca Records built on this by issuing a number of 78rpm album sets, some featuring freshly recorded material and others utilizing Crosby's back catalogue. Ten of these sets were released in 1946, nine in 1947 and twelve more in 1948.

Reception
Billboard commented:
This, the 12th Decca album of Crosby, shows Bing at his sober sentimental best, doing tunes selected for sacrosanct dignity and hallowed usage. Most of the sides have had field days as singles, but their group character is reasonably certain to insure the package of a wide sale. It’s a family album, with interest for almost anyone who buys pop music, gaffers and youngsters alike. Bing is especially mellow on the quality standards, “Whiffenpoof,” “Babe” and “Nellie,” and plenty good enough on the rest.

Track listing
These previously issued songs were featured on a 4-disc, 78 rpm album set, Decca Album No. A-663.

Other releases
The album with all of the same selections was transferred to a 10" LP in 1949 with the catalog number DL 5028. The set was also released in 1950 on four 45 rpm discs on a set numbered 9-119.

References

Bing Crosby compilation albums
1948 compilation albums
Decca Records compilation albums